Bredni Roque Mendoza (born 11 November 1987) is a Mexican Olympic weightlifter. He represented his country at the 2016 Summer Olympics and finished 4th after one competitor was disqualified due to doping.

References 

1987 births
Living people
Mexican male weightlifters
Weightlifters at the 2016 Summer Olympics
Olympic weightlifters of Mexico
Pan American Games medalists in weightlifting
Pan American Games silver medalists for Mexico
Weightlifters at the 2015 Pan American Games
Medalists at the 2015 Pan American Games
21st-century Mexican people